Yenikend or Yenikənd or Yenikänd or Yenikand or Yenik’end or Yengikend (Azerbaijani and Turkish for "new village") may refer to:
Aşağı Kəsəmən, Azerbaijan
Yenikənd, Agdash, Azerbaijan
Yenikənd, Agsu, Azerbaijan
Yenikənd, Gadabay, Azerbaijan
Yenikənd, Goranboy, Azerbaijan
Yenikənd, Goychay, Azerbaijan
Yenikənd, Kalbajar, Azerbaijan
Yenikənd, Khojavend, Azerbaijan
Yenikənd, Kurdamir, Azerbaijan
Yenikənd, Nakhchivan (disambiguation)
Danyeri, Azerbaijan
Kiçikoba, Azerbaijan 
Yenikənd, Neftchala, Azerbaijan
Yenikənd, Oghuz, Azerbaijan
Yenikənd, Qabala, Azerbaijan
Yenikənd, Quba, Azerbaijan
Yenikənd, Sabirabad, Azerbaijan
Yenikənd, Salyan, Azerbaijan
Yenikənd, Samukh, Azerbaijan
Yenikənd, Shamakhi, Azerbaijan
Yenikənd, Siazan, Azerbaijan
Yenikənd, Tartar, Azerbaijan
Yenikend, Zangilan, Azerbaijan
Yenikend reservoir, Azerbaijan
Yenikend Hydroelectric Power Station, Azerbaijan
Yenikend, Iran, near Tabriz